Diospyros diepenhorstii is a tree in the family Ebenaceae. Twigs are brownish to blackish. The tree is named for Dutch botanist H. Diepenhorst. Habitat is forests from sea-level to  altitude. D. diepenhorstii is found in Peninsular Thailand and from west Malesia to the Philippines.

References

diepenhorstii
Plants described in 1861
Trees of Thailand
Trees of Malesia
Taxa named by Friedrich Anton Wilhelm Miquel